Psara chathamalis is a moth in the family Crambidae. It was described by Schaus in 1923. It is found on the Galapagos Islands.

References

Spilomelinae
Moths described in 1923